Golzar-e Mohammad (also Romanized as Golzār-e Moḩammad) is a village in Rigestan Rural District, Zavareh District, Ardestan County, Isfahan Province, Iran. At the 2006 census, its population was 123, in 30 families.

References 

Populated places in Ardestan County